The 1893 Virginia Cavaliers baseball team represented the Virginia Cavaliers of the University of Virginia in the 1893 college baseball season.

The Cavaliers advanced to the first national championship event for college baseball, held at the Chicago World's Fair and pitting top teams from the East, South, and West.  Virginia defeated three other schools for the opportunity to face the top teams from New England.  They finished third in that event, but were widely considered the second-best team in the tournament.

Schedule

References

Virginia Cavaliers
Virginia Cavaliers baseball seasons
Virginia